The Grand Trunk station was a historic railroad station in Oxford, Maine. The station was built in 1883 by the Grand Trunk Railroad linking Oxford with Montreal and Portland, Maine. The village grew especially after the arrival of the St. Lawrence & Atlantic Railroad toward the end of 1840. The railroad opened the village to several business ventures between Portland and Montreal. The railroad passes through the midst of the town, in the same general line with the river, and has a station (Oxford Depot) a short distance south of the centre.

After the cessation of rail services at the station in 1965, it was demolished in 1968.

See also 
 Grand Trunk station (Bethel)
 Grand Trunk station (Gorham)
 Grand Trunk station (Lewiston)
 Grand Trunk station (Yarmouth)
 Grand Trunk station (Berlin, New Hampshire)
 Grand Trunk station (South Paris) 
 Grand Trunk station (Island Pond) 
 Grand Trunk station (Mechanic Falls)

References 

Railway stations in the United States opened in 1883
Railway stations in Maine
Oxford, Maine
Oxford, Maine
Transportation buildings and structures in Androscoggin County, Maine
Railway stations closed in 1965